The White Obelisk is a large stone monolith found at the ancient Assyrian settlement of Nineveh, northern Iraq. Excavated by the British archaeologist Hormuzd Rassam in 1853, it is one of only two intact obelisks to survive from the Assyrian empire, the other being the Black Obelisk of Shalmaneser III. Both are now preserved in the British Museum. The White Obelisk dates to the beginning of the Neo-Assyrian Empire and has been variously ascribed to the reigns of Ashurnasirpal I (c. 1040 BC), Tiglath-Pileser II (c. 950 BC) or Ashurnasirpal II (c. 870 BC).

Discovery
The obelisk was discovered at Nineveh by the Iraqi archaeologist Hormuzd Rassam in July 1853. According to the excavator's report, it was found about 60 metres to the northeast of Sennacherib's palace at a depth of about 5 metres below the surface of the mound. It was then shipped to London via Bombay on HMS Akbar in March 1854, arriving in the British capital in February 1855, where it was immediately deposited in the national collection.

Description
The White Obelisk is a very large four-sided pillar made from white limestone with engraved decoration in relief on all sides of the obelisk, with an inscription at the top. The carvings show campaigns and recreational activities (including a hunt) of an Assyrian king that has been identified as either Ashurnasirpal I, Tiglath-Pileser II or Ashurnasirpal II. According to Julian Reade, the style of dress suggests that this impressive stela was set up under the reign of Ashurnasirpal I, since many courtiers wear a Fez-like hat, which is only known from sculptural work made in the thirteenth century BC. If this is the case, the White Obelisk is one of the earliest representations of Assyrian art in existence.

Inscription and reliefs

The preserved part of the inscription at the top of the obelisk describes the Assyrian king as a great conqueror, taking booty, prisoners and herds of animals to the city of Assur. On each of the four sides of the obelisk are eight rows of panels with relief representations. Engraved on them are various scenes including military expeditions of the king, the monarch receiving tribute, great banquets of courtiers and the hunting of wild animals. One set of religious scenes is accompanied by an inscription, which explains that the scene depicts the king pouring a libation in front of the goddess Ishtar, who was the principal deity of Nineveh.

See also
Black Obelisk of Shalmaneser III

References

Bibliography

11th-century BC steles
1853 archaeological discoveries
Middle Eastern sculptures in the British Museum
Sculpture of the Ancient Near East
Assyrian art and architecture
Ancient obelisks
Victory steles
Cultural depictions of Ashurbanipal
Assyrian inscriptions